MS  Oslofjord was an ocean liner built in 1938 by A/G Weser Shipbuilders, Bremen, Germany, for Norwegian America Line. She was of 18,673 gross register tons, and could carry 860 passengers. She would had a uneventful career until in 1939 were two separate incidents happened. One 27 April 1939, Oslofjord collided with the American an pilot boat, and other were she struck a mine sinking her.

Career

Early years

The 18,673 GRT motor ship was built in 15 May 1936, launched on December 29, 1937 at Bremer Schiffswerft AG Weser , was 171.75 meters long, 22.37 meters wide and five decks high. 860 passengers (152 in cabin class, 307 in tourist class and 401 in third class) and 310 crew members were taken on board.
The Oslofjord was powered by four seven-cylinder diesel engines from Maschinenfabrik Augsburg-Nürnberg AG , which acted on two propellers . The transfer to the owners took place in May 1938. The shipping company Den Norske Amerikalinje was founded in 1910 to establish a passenger service between Norway and the United States . Their ships served the Oslo – Kristiansand – Stavanger – Bergen – New York route.

World War II
During World War II, Oslofjord sank after just two years of service on the night of 21–22 January 1941 after hitting a mine in the North Sea off the coast of England off the River Tyne on 1 December 1940.

References

External links
Norway-Heritage: Oslofjord (2)
Simplon Postcards: Oslofjord (2)

Ocean liners
Passenger ships of Norway
Norwegian America Line
World War II shipwrecks in the North Sea
Maritime incidents in 1939
Maritime incidents in December 1940
Maritime incidents in January 1941
Ships built in Bremen (state)
Wreck diving sites in England
Ships sunk by mines
1941 in England